Käthe Hoffmann (born 1883) was a German botanist who described many plant species in New Guinea and South East Asia including Annesijoa novoguineensis. She was a professor at Breslau, German Empire, (now Wroclaw, Poland) and made a significant contribution to botany. In one study, she was found to have co-authored or authored 354 land plant species, the sixth-highest number authored by any female scientist. , Plants of the World Online lists 439 accepted genera and species which include Käthe Hoffmann in the authority, in some capacity.

While some sources give her year of death as 1931, this is impossible as she was the author of two papers published in Revista Sudamericana de Botánica in 1942, one of them being an obituary of Ferdinand Albin Pax.

Relationship to Käthe Rosenthal
Another female botanist's name, Käthe Rosenthal, is associated with the University of Breslau in the early 20th century. Her name appears alongside those of Ferdinand Pax and Käthe Hoffmann in issue 68 of Adolf Engler's multivolume work Das Pflanzenreich. Pax and Hoffmann are listed as the authors of three sections on parts of the family Euphorbiaceae. Rosenthal is listed as the author of a section on the family Daphniphyllaceae. Earlier, in 1916, a PhD thesis with the author Käthe Rosenthal had been published under the title "Monographie der Gattung Daphniphyllum" ("Monograph of the genus Daphniphyllum"). The International Plant Names Index (IPNI) gives Rosenthal's author abbreviation as "K.Rosenth." with the year of birth 1893, i.e. 10 years after Hoffmann. She also thanks, among others, Frl. Käthe Hoffmann "for valuable advice in my work" ("").

Some sources treat the two as the same person. Thus the Bibliothèque nationale de France gives Käthe Hoffmann's year of birth as 1893, and states that "Käthe Rosenthal" is "" ("another form of name"). Käthe Hoffmann may also be given as the author of the Daphniphyllum monograph instead of Käthe Rosenthal.

Selected publications

Das Pflanzenreich 
Between 1911 and 1924, Ferdinand Pax and Käthe Hoffmann contributed almost all the sections on the family Euphorbiaceae to Engler's monumental work, Das Pflanzenreich (The Plant Kingdom). (The first two sections on the family, published in 1910, were by Pax alone; one section published in 1915 has a different author.) Up to 1914, Hoffmann's name appeared on the title page as "" ('with the participation of'). From 1919 onwards, she was credited as the second author.
F. Pax with the participation of Käthe Hoffmann (1911). "IV. 147. III Euphorbiaceae–Cluytieae". Heft (issue) 47.
F. Pax with the participation of Käthe Hoffmann (1912). "IV. 147. IV Euphorbiaceae-Gelonieae". Heft 52.
F. Pax with the participation of Käthe Hoffmann (1912). "IV. 147. V Euphorbiaceae-Hippomaneae". Heft 52.
F. Pax with the participation of Käthe Hoffmann (1912). "IV. 147. VI Euphorbiaceae-Acalypheae-Chrozophorinae". Heft 57.
F. Pax with the participation of Käthe Hoffmann (1914). "IV. 147. VII Euphorbiaceaee-Acalypheae-Mercurialinae". Heft 63.
F. Pax & Käthe Hoffman (1919). "IV. 147. IX Euphorbiaceae-Acalypheae-Plukenetiinae". Heft 68.
F. Pax & Käthe Hoffman (1919). "IV. 147. X Euphorbiaceae-Acalypheae-Epiprininae". Heft 68.
F. Pax & Käthe Hoffman (1919). "IV. 147. XI Euphorbiaceae-Acalypheae-Ricininae". Heft 68.
F. Pax & Käthe Hoffman (1919). "IV. 147. XII Euphorbiaceae-Dalechampieae". Heft 68.
F. Pax & Käthe Hoffman (1919). "IV. 147. XIII Euphorbiaceae-Pereae". Heft 68.
F. Pax & Käthe Hoffman (1919). "IV. 147. XIV Euphorbiaceae-Aditamentum IV". Heft 68.
F. Pax & Käthe Hoffman (1922). "IV. 147. XV Euphorbiaceae-Phyllanthoideae-Phyllantheae". Heft 81.
F. Pax & Käthe Hoffman (1924). "IV. 147. XVI Euphorbiaceae-Crotonoideae-Acalypheae-Acalyphinae". Heft 85.

Author abbreviation

References

Botanists with author abbreviations
20th-century German botanists
German taxonomists
Women taxonomists
1883 births
Women botanists
20th-century German women scientists
Year of death missing